Zdeněk Štybar (born 11 December 1985) is a Czech professional cyclist, who currently rides for UCI WorldTeam . While best known as a cyclo-cross racer, in 2011 Štybar began his professional road career while continuing to race cyclo-cross.

Career

Early life and cyclo-cross career

Štybar was born in Planá u Mariánských Lázní.

Following consecutive second places in 2008 and 2009, Štybar won the 2010 UCI Cyclo-cross World Championships in his home nation.

In 2011, he won the World championships for a second time.

Quick-Step (2011–2022)

In March 2011, Stybar joined the UCI World Tour team  to combine his cyclo-cross career with a career in road cycling.

In 2012 he pulled off a victory on the road by winning a stage in the Four Days of Dunkirk.

In 2013, Štybar came in sixth in Paris–Roubaix. He was in contention for the victory as he was part of the leading trio with Sep Vanmarcke and Fabian Cancellara when he hit a spectator, causing him to slow down to clip in his pedals. He tried to get back to the two leaders, but to no avail. In August of the same year, Štybar took the overall victory in the Eneco Tour – part of the UCI World Tour – winning two stages in the process. Later that month, Štybar won stage 7 of the 2013 Vuelta a España beating world champion Philippe Gilbert in a sprint finish in Mairena del Aljarafe.

In 2014, Štybar won the World Cyclo-cross championships for a third time in an intense battle with defending world champion Sven Nys.

In trying to defend his title in the 2014 Eneco Tour, Stybar crashed into the steel barriers in the fourth stage near the finish line and had to undergo hospitalization. He broke and lost his front upper teeth in the crash. Upon his return, he complained to the UCI that the same dangerous barriers were used in the Grand Prix Cycliste de Québec. His first victory upon his return was Binche–Chimay–Binche, where he attacked inside two kilometers to go on a small cobbled climb after being led out by his teammate Niki Terpstra at the foot of the rise. Štybar had time to celebrate, coming in 2 seconds before John Degenkolb and the charging sprinters.

In 2015, Stybar won the Italian Classic Strade Bianche. He also had a good Belgian classics campaign. He finished second in E3 Harelbeke behind Geraint Thomas. At the Tour of Flanders, his false set of front teeth he broke in 2014 rattled loose as he was riding a cobbled climb and he had to take them off. He still managed to finish the race in ninth position. He grabbed second place in Paris–Roubaix, being outsprinted by John Degenkolb at Roubaix Velodrome.

Stybar was named in the start list for the 2015 Tour de France. He met success on Stage 6, where he powered away on a short but steep incline situated a few hundred meters before the finish line in Le Havre. He kept Peter Sagan from reaching him, crossing the line with a two seconds advantage over the reduced group.

Stybar finished second in the 2016 Strade Bianche after being outsprinted by fellow escapee Fabian Cancellara at the finish in Siena. The following week, he won the second stage of the 2016 Tirreno–Adriatico after a late solo attack, to take the race lead. He finished seventh overall in the race.

Stybar finished second behind Greg Van Avermaet at the 2017 Paris–Roubaix, in a five-man sprint finish in Roubaix Velodrome.

In May 2018, he was named in the startlist for the 2018 Giro d'Italia. In 2019, he once again placed in the top 10 at Paris–Roubaix, his sixth top-ten finish at the race.

Major results

Cyclo-cross

2001–2002
 1st  National Junior Championships
 3rd  UCI World Junior Championships
2002–2003
 3rd  UCI World Junior Championships
2004–2005
 1st  UCI World Under-23 Championships
 1st  National Under-23 Championships
 3rd Overall UCI Under-23 World Cup
2nd Nommay
3rd Hofstade
 Under-23 Superprestige
2nd Diegem
3rd Sint-Michielsgestel
 2nd Under-23 Milan
2005–2006
 1st  UCI World Under-23 Championships
 Under-23 Superprestige
2nd Sint-Michielsgestel
2nd Vorselaar
3rd Gavere
3rd Hoogstraten
 3rd Overall Under-23 Gazet van Antwerpen
2nd Koppenbergcross
2nd Azencross
 2nd Hasselt
 3rd  UEC European Under-23 Championships
2006–2007
 1st Kermiscross
 1st Harderwijk
 1st Fae' di Oderzo
 UCI Under-23 World Cup
1st Treviso
2nd Hofstade
 Under-23 Superprestige
1st Ruddervoorde
2nd Sint-Michielsgestel
2nd Gavere
2nd Diegem
2nd Vorselaar
2nd Hamme
2nd Diegem
2nd Hoogstraten
 2nd  UEC European Under-23 Championships
 2nd National Championships
 2nd Steenbergcross
 2nd Houtlandcross
 3rd Scheldecross
2007–2008
 1st  National Championships
 UCI World Cup
1st Kalmthout
 Toi Toi Cup
1st Louny
1st Plzen
1st Podborany
 1st Fae' di Oderzo
 2nd  UCI World Championships
 3rd Overall Gazet van Antwerpen
2nd Azencross
2nd GP Sven Nys
3rd Koppenbergcross
3rd GP Rouwmoer
 4th Overall Superprestige
2nd Ruddervoorde
2nd Hamme
2nd Hoogstraten
3rd Diegem
2008–2009
 1st  National Championships
 2nd  UCI World Championships
 Superprestige
1st Diegem
 2nd Mechelen
 3rd Overall Gazet van Antwerpen
1st Azencross
2nd GP Rouwmoer
2nd GP Sven Nys
 3rd Overall UCI World Cup
2nd Tábor
2nd Roubaix
3rd Koksijde
3rd Milan
 3rd Zonhoven
 3rd Neerpelt
 3rd Tervuren
 Toi Toi Cup
3rd Hlinsko
2009–2010
 1st  UCI World Championships
 1st  National Championships
 1st  Overall UCI World Cup
1st Koksijde
1st Igorre
1st Roubaix
2nd Treviso
2nd Nommay
2nd Kalmthout
2nd Hoogerheide
3rd Plzeň
 1st Overall Superprestige
1st Hamme
1st Vorselaar
2nd Hoogstraten
2nd Diegem
2nd Zonhoven
3rd Ruddervoorde
3rd Gavere
 1st Tervuren
 1st Mechelen
 2nd Overall Gazet van Antwerpen
1st Hasselt
2nd GP Sven Nys
2nd Krawatencross
2nd Sluitingsprijs
3rd Namur
3rd GP Rouwmoer
3rd Azencross
 Toi Toi Cup
1st Stribro
1st Podborany
 2nd Ardooie
 2nd Neerpelt
 3rd Antwerp
 3rd Niel
2010–2011
 1st  UCI World Championships
 1st  National Championships
 1st Ardooie
 1st Bredene
 1st Mechelen
 UCI World Cup
1st Aigle
1st Plzeň
2nd Koksijde
 2nd Overall Gazet van Antwerpen
1st Citadelcross
2nd Hasselt
3rd Azencross
 3rd Overall Superprestige
1st Ruddervoorde
1st Zonhoven
2nd GP Sven Nys
2nd Lille
2nd Oostmalle
3rd Diegem
 Toi Toi Cup
1st Stribro
1st Louny
 2nd Zonnebeke
 2nd Eeklo
 3rd Heerlen
2011–2012
 1st  National Championships
 Toi Toi Cup
1st Stribro
 1st Baden
 1st Ardooie
 2nd Overall Gazet van Antwerpen
2nd Ronse
2nd Hasselt
2nd Azencross
2nd Krawatencross
2nd Sluitingsprijs
3rd Koppenbergcross
 2nd Mechelen
 3rd Overall UCI World Cup
1st Liévin
2nd Tábor
2nd Heusden-Zolder
2nd Hoogerheide
3rd Plzeň
 3rd Overall Superprestige
1st Hamme
1st Middelkerke
3rd Gavere
 2nd Bredene
2012–2013
 1st  National Championships
 BPost Bank Trophy
2nd Azencross
2nd GP Sven Nys
 UCI World Cup
3rd Heusden-Zolder
 Superprestige
3rd Diegem
 3rd Bredene
2013–2014
 1st  UCI World Championships
 1st Bredene
 BPost Bank Trophy
2nd GP Sven Nys
 UCI World Cup
3rd Heusden-Zolder
2022–2023
 1st Dohnany Day 2
 2nd Dohnany Day 1

UCI World Cup results

Gravel
2022
 8th UCI World Championships

Road

2005
 8th Gran Premio della Liberazione
 9th Overall Giro delle Regioni
2006
 1st Stage 6 Volta a Lleida
 1st Stage 3 Tour des Pyrénées
2007
 3rd Grand Prix Criquielion
2010
 1st Prologue Okolo Slovenska
2011
 3rd Road race, National Championships
 3rd Overall Four Days of Dunkirk
2012
 1st Stage 3 Tour de Pologne
 2nd Time trial, National Championships
 2nd Overall Four Days of Dunkirk
1st Stage 4
 10th Paris–Tours
2013
 1st  Overall Eneco Tour
1st Stages 3 & 7
 1st Stage 7 Vuelta a España
 1st Stage 1 (TTT) Tirreno–Adriatico
 6th Paris–Roubaix
2014
 National Championships
1st  Road race
3rd Time trial
 1st Binche–Chimay–Binche
 1st Stage 2 Eneco Tour
 5th Paris–Roubaix
 7th Milan–San Remo
 10th Clásica de San Sebastián
2015
 1st Strade Bianche
 1st Stage 6 Tour de France
 2nd E3 Harelbeke
 2nd Paris–Roubaix
 3rd Overall Czech Cycling Tour
1st  Points classification
1st Stages 1 (TTT) & 4
 3rd Vuelta a Murcia
 5th Overall Tour of Britain
 7th Omloop Het Nieuwsblad
 9th Tour of Flanders
2016
 2nd Road race, National Championships
 2nd Strade Bianche
 2nd Binche–Chimay–Binche
 3rd Trofeo Pollenca–Port de Andratx
 7th Overall Tirreno–Adriatico
1st Stage 2
 7th Overall Eneco Tour
 8th Tour of Flanders
 8th Gran Piemonte
2017
 1st  Road race, National Championships
 2nd Paris–Roubaix
 4th Strade Bianche
 9th Kuurne–Brussels–Kuurne
2018
 1st  Points classification, BinckBank Tour
 6th Bretagne Classic
 6th Grand Prix Cycliste de Québec
 6th Dwars door Vlaanderen
 7th Strade Bianche
 8th Gent–Wevelgem
 9th Paris–Roubaix
 9th E3 Harelbeke
 10th Tour of Flanders
2019
 1st E3 BinckBank Classic
 1st Omloop Het Nieuwsblad
 4th Strade Bianche
 6th Overall Volta ao Algarve
1st Stage 5
 8th Paris–Roubaix
2020
 1st Stage 6 Vuelta a San Juan
 2nd Road race, National Championships
 6th Strade Bianche
2021
 5th E3 Saxo Bank Classic
 7th Road race, UCI World Championships
 7th Primus Classic
2022
 2nd Grote Prijs Jef Scherens

Grand Tour general classification results timeline

Classics results timeline

References

External links

1985 births
Living people
People from Planá
Cyclo-cross cyclists
Czech male cyclists
Czech Vuelta a España stage winners
UCI Cyclo-cross World Champions (men)
Czech Tour de France stage winners
Cyclists at the 2016 Summer Olympics
Olympic cyclists of the Czech Republic
Cyclists at the 2020 Summer Olympics
Sportspeople from the Plzeň Region